The Leatherwood Station Covered Bridge is a single span double Burr Arch Truss covered bridge structure that was built by Joseph A. Britton & Son in 1899. Originally it had sandstone abutments but when it was moved to Billie Creek Village they were replaced with concrete abutments with sandstone showing.

History
The bridge was named after the nearby B&O Railroad station at its original location. It was also known as the "Harry Wolf Bridge." Wolf owned the land near the bridge. The portal was later modified into a J. J. Daniels Arch while the original angular Britton Arch framing is still visible from the inside.

A letter from J. J. Daniels dated May 18, 1899, says that he had made a bid to build the bridge for $680. Since J. A. Britton was awarded the contract it can be assumed that his bid was less than Daniels.

According to Historic American Engineering Record documentation of the bridge, it was repaired in 1940 by the Works Progress Administration. It was built by Britton who built approximately 40 bridges in three Indiana counties, Parke, Putnam, and Vermillion, during a 33-year period.

It was added to the National Register of Historic Places in 1978.

Gallery
Images of Leatherwood Station Covered Bridge prior to being moved to Billie Creek Village.

See also
List of bridges documented by the Historic American Engineering Record in Indiana
List of Registered Historic Places in Indiana
Parke County Covered Bridges
Parke County Covered Bridge Festival

References

External links

Parke County Covered Bridge Festival

Bridges completed in 1899
Historic American Engineering Record in Indiana
Covered bridges on the National Register of Historic Places in Parke County, Indiana
1899 establishments in Indiana
Historic district contributing properties in Indiana
Wooden bridges in Indiana
Burr Truss bridges in the United States